Tampea wollastoni is a moth in the subfamily Arctiinae. It was described by Walter Rothschild in 1916. It is found in Papua New Guinea.

References

Moths described in 1916
Lithosiini